Calamotropha fuscacostalis is a moth in the family Crambidae. It was described by Koen V. N. Maes in 2012. It is found in Cameroon.

References

Crambinae
Moths described in 2012